Star Channel may refer to:

 Star Channel (Finnish TV channel), a free-to-air television channel in Finland owned by The Walt Disney Company, formerly known as Fox
 Star Channel (Greek TV channel), a television network
 Star Channel (Japan), a satellite pay television station group
 Star Channel (Latin American TV channel), a pay television channel in Latin America owned by The Walt Disney Company, formerly known as Fox Channel
 Star Channel, the original name (1973–1979) of The Movie Channel, an American premium cable and satellite television network

See also
Star TV (disambiguation)